The Magritte Award for Most Promising Actress (French: Magritte du meilleur espoir féminin) is an award presented annually by the Académie André Delvaux. It is given in honor of a young actress who has delivered an outstanding breakthrough performance while working within the film industry. It is one of the Magritte Awards, which were established to recognize excellence in Belgian cinematic achievements. 

The 1st Magritte Awards ceremony was held in 2011 with Pauline Étienne receiving the award for her role in Private Lessons. As of the 2022 ceremony, Maya Vanderbeque is the most recent winner in this category for her role in Playground.

Winners and nominees
In the list below, winners are listed first in the colored row, followed by the other nominees.

2010s

2020s

References

External links
 Magritte Awards official website
 Magritte Award for Most Promising Actress at AlloCiné

Promising Actress
Awards for young actors